Distant Thunder (translit. Ashani Sanket) is a 1973 Bengali film by the Indian director Satyajit Ray, based on the novel by the same name by Bibhutibhushan Bandopadhyay. 
Unlike most of Ray's earlier films, Distant Thunder was filmed in colour. It stars Soumitra Chatterjee, who headlined numerous Ray films, and the Bangladeshi actress Bobita in her only prominent international role. Today the film features in  The New York Times Guide to the Best 1,000 Movies Ever Made. It marked the debut of the theatre star Mrityunjay Sil.

Overview
The film is set in a village in the Indian province of Bengal during World War II, and examines the effect of the Great Famine of 1943 on the villages of Bengal through the eyes of a young Brahmin doctor-teacher, Gangacharan, and his wife, Angana. Ray shows the human scale of a cataclysmic event that killed more than 3 million people. The film unfolds at a leisurely pace that reflects the rhythms of village life, but gradually shows the breakdown of traditional village norms under the pressure of hunger and starvation.

Cast
 Soumitra Chatterjee as Gangacharan Chakravarti
 Bobita as Angana/Gangacharan's wife
 Chitra Banerjee as Moti
 Govinda Chakravarti - Dinabandhu
 Anil Ganguly as Nibaran
 Noni Ganguly as Scarface' Jadu
 Debatosh Ghosh as Adhar
 Ramesh Mukherjee as Biswas
 Sheli Pal as Mokshada
 Suchita Ray Chaudhury as Khenti
 Sandhya Roy	as Chutki
 Mrityunjay Sil as Ajay (Cameo)

Reception
Vincent Canby of The New York Times called the film "moving" and "elegiac". He remarks that the film "has the impact of an epic without seeming to mean to" and noted various connections with Ray's own Apu Trilogy (in its casting of Chatterjee and in it being an adaptation of another Bibhutibhushan Bandopadhyay novel). "It is, however, very different from those early films" he writes, "It is the work of a director who has learned the value of narrative economy to such an extent that 'Distant Thunder,' which is set against the backdrop of the 'manmade' famine that wiped out 5 million people in 1943, has the simplicity of a fable." Tom Milne of Time Out calls the film "[d]istant thunder, indeed; a superb film." Dennis Schwartz gave the film an A- and called it "[a] gentle humanist film that informs the world that over five million died of starvation and epidemics in Bengal." Jay Cocks writing for Time echoes Canby's assessment of it as a "fable", writing: "Distant Thunder has the deliberate, unadorned reality of a folk tale, a fable of encroaching, enlarging catastrophe." He calls the film "superb and achingly simple ... Numbers as huge as ["5 million"] can be dangerous. A tragedy of such magnitude becomes an event abstracted by arithmetic. But Ray's artistry alters the scale. His concentrating on just a few victims of the famine causes such massive loss to become real, immediate. Ray makes numbers count."

Legacy
In 2012, filmmaker Amit Dutta included the film in his personal top ten (for "The Sight & Sound Top 50 Greatest Films of All Time" poll).

Awards
 Berlin International Film Festival
 1973: Golden Bear for Best Film
 21st National Film Awards
 National Film Award for Best Feature Film in Bengali - Ashani Sanket
 National Film Award for Best Music Direction - Satyajit Ray
 National Film Award for Best Cinematography - Soumendu Roy

References

External links
 as Asani Sanket at SatyajitRay.org
 
 

Films directed by Satyajit Ray
1973 films
1973 drama films
Bengali-language Indian films
Films set in 1943
Films set in Bengal
Golden Bear winners
Indian World War II films
Social realism in film
Films whose cinematographer won the Best Cinematography National Film Award
Films about famine
Films with screenplays by Satyajit Ray
Best Bengali Feature Film National Film Award winners
1970s Bengali-language films
Films based on works by Bibhutibhushan Bandyopadhyay
Indian drama films